The 1971 Cincinnati Reds season consisted of the Reds finishing in a fourth place tie with the Houston Astros in the National League West, with a record of 79–83, 11 games behind the NL West champion San Francisco Giants. The Reds were managed by Sparky Anderson, and played their first full season of home games at Riverfront Stadium, which had opened at mid-season in the previous year. This was the team's only losing season of the 1970s.

Offseason 
 October 20, 1970: Sonny Ruberto was sent to the Reds by the San Diego Padres in a conditional deal.
 March 31, 1971: Stan Swanson was traded by the Reds to the Montreal Expos for Jim Qualls.

Regular season

Season standings

Record vs. opponents

Notable transactions 
 May 29, 1971: Frank Duffy and Vern Geishert were traded by the Reds to the San Francisco Giants for George Foster.
 June 8, 1971: Dave Revering was drafted by the Reds in the 7th round of the 1971 Major League Baseball Draft.

Roster

Player stats

Batting

Starters by position 
Note: Pos = Position; G = Games played; AB = At bats; H = Hits; Avg. = Batting average; HR = Home runs; RBI = Runs batted in

Other batters 
Note: G = Games played; AB = At bats; H = Hits; Avg. = Batting average; HR = Home runs; RBI = Runs batted in

Pitching

Starting pitchers 
Note: G = Games pitched; IP = Innings pitched; W = Wins; L = Losses; ERA = Earned run average; SO = Strikeouts

Other pitchers 
Note: G = Games pitched; IP = Innings pitched; W = Wins; L = Losses; ERA = Earned run average; SO = Strikeouts

Relief pitchers 
Note: G = Games pitched; W = Wins; L = Losses; SV = Saves; ERA = Earned run average; SO = Strikeouts

Farm system

Notes

References 
1971 Cincinnati Reds season at Baseball Reference

Cincinnati Reds seasons
Cincinnati Reds season
Cincinnati